Månz Karlsson (born 4 April 1989 in Växjö) is a Swedish footballer who plays for Östers IF as a defender. Karlsson's nicknamed Elaka Månz (Mean Månz), because of his tackles that often generated yellow cards.

Club career

Östers IF
Born and raised in Växjö, Karlsson played youth level football for both Växjö Norra IF and later Östers IF. He got promoted to the first team of Östers IF in 2008, when they played in Division 1. He managed to help the team advance to Allsvenskan for the 2013 season, in which he played 28 games and scored two goals. Östers IF got relegated to Superettan the same year.

Åtvidabergs FF
Karlsson wanted to continue playing first tier football, so he decided to move from Växjö to play with Åtvidabergs FF for the 2014 season. He signed a three-year-long contract with the club. His first goal for Åtvidabergs FF came against Gefle IF on 21 April 2014.

Honours
Östers IF
Division 1 Södra: 2009
Superettan: 2012

References

External links

ÅFF profile

1989 births
Living people
Swedish footballers
Allsvenskan players
Superettan players
Östers IF players
Åtvidabergs FF players
Association football defenders
People from Växjö
Sportspeople from Kronoberg County